The men's 100 meter team running deer, double shots was a shooting sports event held as part of the Shooting at the 1924 Summer Olympics programme. It was the third appearance of the event. The competition was held on 3 July 1924 at the shooting ranges at Versailles. 25 shooters from 7 nations competed.

Results
Every shooter fired 10 times, two shots, with points from 0 to 5 (5 was the best) so a maximum of 100 points was possible. The scores of the four shooters on each team were summed to give a team score. No further shooting was done. The maximum score was 400.

Hungary was allowed to compete with an incomplete team; only one shooter participated.

The new Olympic champion in the individual competition Ole Lilloe-Olsen finished second with as part of the Norwegian team. British shooter Cyril Mackworth-Praed won this, his first gold medal, in a team event, having already won silver medals in two individual events.

Cyril Mackworth-Praed was able to score 76 rings as Ole Lilloe-Olsen did in the individual competition.

References

External links
 Official Report
 

Shooting at the 1924 Summer Olympics

100 meter running deer at the Olympics